Jill Hoffman is an American poet, and editor.

She graduated from Bennington College with a B.A., from Columbia University with an M. A., and from Cornell University with a Ph.D.  She taught at Bard College, Brooklyn College, Columbia University, and The New School.

She founded Mudfish, in 1984, and the Mudfish Individual Poet Series (Box Turtle Press). 
Her work appeared in New York Quarterly, Paris Review, and The New Yorker.

Awards
 1974 Guggenheim Fellowship

Works

Poetry
Mink Coat Holt, Rinehart and Winston, 1973, 
black diaries, Box Turtle Press, 2000, 
The Gates of Pearl, 2008/09

Novels
Jilted, Simon & Schuster, 1993, 
Topless

References

External links
Mudfish website

Bennington College alumni
Columbia University alumni
Cornell University alumni
Bard College faculty
Brooklyn College faculty
The New School faculty
Columbia University faculty
Living people
Year of birth missing (living people)
American women poets
American women academics
21st-century American women